Chinna Kannamma is a 1993 Indian Tamil language drama film directed by R. Raghu. The film stars Karthik, Gautami, Suhasini, Nassar and Shamili. It was released on 29 January 1993.

Plot

Aravind, a youngster who was transferred for a job, falls in love with Gayathri. Despite their parents' refusal, they marry and soon Gayathri gets pregnant. Few days before her labour, she had a brief conversation with another young lady, Uma who was also waiting for the delivery of her second child. On the night of labour, both Gayathri and Uma gave birth to two baby girls respectively.

Due to a minor fire accident, while moving the other babies to a safer place, a young nurse mistakenly gave the two newborn female babies to the wrong couple. When she informed the senior nurse about this, the latter didn't allow to make this issue bigger as this will worsen the reputation of their hospital, causing the young nurse to be in guilt.

After two years, Aravind and Gayathri with their daughter, Saranya lives happily. Later, Gayathri dies and Aravind shifts to Ooty with his daughter. In Ooty, he befriends a couple, Pradeep and Uma, and their kids become friends too. One day, Uma's daughter dies due to heart disease. Not being able to bear the loss of their only daughter, they decided to ask Aravind to allow then to adopt Saranya, which he undoubtedly disagrees.

One day, the young nurse who once took care of Uma and the late Gayathri falls sick and before dying, she revealed to Uma that Priya is not their daughter, but someone else's. Soon Pradeep finds out that it is Saranya who is their original daughter. After Aravind refused on giving up Saranya to Pradeep and Uma, the couple takes the affair to the court and finally wins the case, which allows Saranya to be with Uma and Pradeep. Saranya doesn't want to live with them, so Uma later lets her to go back to Aravind.

Cast
 Karthik as Aravind
 Gautami as Gayatri
 Suhasini as Uma
 Bhagyalakshmi alias Bhagyasri  as Nurse Padma
 Nassar as Pradeep
 Shamili as Saranya
 V. K. Ramasamy as Ramanathan
 Charle as Pichandi
 Vadivukkarasi as a judge
 LIC Narasimhan as a doctor
 Kamala Kamesh as Gayatri's mother
 Baby Pooja as Priya
 Master Siva as Tarun
 Baby Divya

Soundtrack
The film score and the soundtrack were composed by Ilaiyaraaja. The soundtrack, released in 1993, features 5 tracks with lyrics written by Vaali, Panchu Arunachalam, Piraisoodan and Shanmuga Panchu.

References

External links
 

1993 films
Tamil films remade in other languages
Films scored by Ilaiyaraaja
1990s Tamil-language films
Films directed by R. Raghu